Eucalyptus optima, is a species of small to medium-sized tree or a mallet that is endemic to a small area in the south of Western Australia. It has smooth white to greyish bark, sometimes with rough black bark on the base of the trunk, lance-shaped adult leaves, flower buds in groups of seven or nine, pale yellow flowers and cup-shaped, hemispherical or urn-shaped fruit.

Description
Eucalyptus optima is a tree or mallet that typically grows to a height of  but does not form a lignotuber. Flowering has been observed in May, August and September and the flowers are pale yellow.

Taxonomy and naming
Eucalyptus optima was first formally described in 1999 by Lawrie Johnson and Ken Hill in the journal Telopea from specimens collected near Balladonia roadhouse in 1983. The specific epithet (optima) is from the Latin optimus, meaning "best", referring to this species being the largest, with the largest buds and fruit in the Series Sociales.

Distribution and habitat
This eucalypt grows in woodland between Balladonia and the Fraser Range in the Coolgardie, Mallee and Nullarbor biogeographic regions.

Conservation status
This eucalypt is classified as "not threatened" by the Western Australian Government Department of Parks and Wildlife.

See also
List of Eucalyptus species

References

Eucalypts of Western Australia
Trees of Australia
optima
Myrtales of Australia
Plants described in 1999
Taxa named by Lawrence Alexander Sidney Johnson
Taxa named by Ken Hill (botanist)